Ashley J. Llorens (also known as SoulStice), was born in 1979 in Chicago, IL. He started seriously pursuing music while earning his B.S. and M.S. at the University of Illinois Urbana-Champaign. In 2003, SoulStice founded the independent label, Wandering Soul Records, concurrently with the release of his first album, North by Northwest. In addition to his career in music, he has worked at Johns Hopkins University Applied Physics Laboratory where he rose to the rank of Senior Researcher  and later became Chief of the Intelligent Systems Laboratory.

Since the release of his 2003 debut album. SoulStice has become a prominent figure on the alternative hip hop scene. In early 2006, SoulStice and Wandering Soul Records signed a national distribution deal through EMI/Caroline to release the album “Dark Water” by his group Wade Waters. In 2007, SoulStice released his second solo album, “Dead Letter Perfect” which was distributed through Universal Music. Garnering significant radio support, “Dead Letter Perfect” led to tours in Europe and Japan as well as coverage in XXL Magazine, The Source, URB, Scratch and most other tastemaker hip hop publications. In 2009, SoulStice released “Beyond Borders,” a collaboration project with Belgian beatmaker SBe, that featured artists from around the globe. His song, “That Thang” was featured in the Oscar-Nominated film, “The Blind Side” starring Sandra Bullock, and his song “Always” was featured on the CBS hit show NCIS Los Angeles.

SoulStice is married to Amanda Drehobl Llorens with whom he has one son, Noah and one daughter, Maya. References to his wife and son are present throughout his various albums.

Discography
Albums/mixtapes
North by Northwest, (2003, Wandering Soul)
North by Northwest: Solid Ground, (2005, Wandering Soul)
Return of the Kings, (2006, Wandering Soul)
Dark Water, (2006, Wandering Soul)
Dead Letter Perfect, (2007, Wandering Soul)
Beyond Borders, (2009, Wandering Soul)

12" Singles
The Melody, (2003, Wandering Soul)
Always / The Quickening, (2005, Wandering Soul)
Rock Solid feat. Cuban Link, (2005, Wandering Soul)
Speak On It feat. AZ, (2006, Wandering Soul)
Be Perfect, (2007, Wandering Soul)
Bird's Eye View feat. Kev Brown, (2008, Wandering Soul)
World Star feat. Zap Mama, (2009, Wandering Soul)
Strange Kinda Love feat. Monique Harcum, (2009, Wandering Soul)

References

External links
 Twitter 
 Google Scholar
 SoulStice on Billboard.com
 SoulStice on SonicBids
 Wandering Soul Records
 Beyond Borders Album Website
 SoulStice on Myspace
 Wade Waters Website

SoulStice
SoulStice
SoulStice
Llorens, Ashley
Year of birth missing (living people)
21st-century African-American people